Hadromyia crawfordi is a species of hoverfly in the family Syrphidae.

Distribution
Canada: British Columbia
United States: Washington, Oregon, California  Montana, Idaho

References

Eristalinae
Insects described in 1916
Diptera of North America
Hoverflies of North America
Taxa named by Raymond Corbett Shannon